Belarusian Church may refer to:

 Belarusian Orthodox Church, canonical branch of the Eastern Orthodox Church in Belarus
 Belarusian Autocephalous Orthodox Church, established in 1922
 Belarusian Byzantine Catholic Church, an Eastern Catholic church of the Byzantine Rite, centered in Belarus
 Catholic Church in Belarus, incorporating all communities and institutions of the Catholic Church in Belarus

See also
 Christianity in Belarus
 Belarusian Orthodox Church (disambiguation)
 Belarusian Catholic Church